Lionel Edgar Charles Letts BEM (15 August 1918 – 23 October 2013) was an English entrepreneur notable for a 75-year career in Southeast Asia during which he took a role on the boards of more than 90 listed companies, survived torture, multiple escape attempts and a death sentence as a Japanese Prisoner of War and acted as a spy on behalf of the British Secret Intelligence Service.

Personal life
Letts was born in the English village of Send two months before the end of World War I, the son of Frederick James Letts, a hairdresser, and Eva Catherine Watts. While a Staff Captain in the Army he married Cecilia Monro on 29 December 1945 in Bangkok, Thailand.

Military career
Letts fought with the International Brigades during the Spanish Civil War  and with the Free Thai Movement during World War II

Business career
Letts played a significant role in the sale of British owned assets in Southeast Asia during the period after World War II, in the process making deep connections with numerous individuals whose families would go on to accumulate huge wealth as the British Empire rolled back in Asia.

Diplomatic Roles
In later life Letts acted as Honorary Consul in Singapore for Brazil and Portugal.

Decorations
During his lifetime Letts was awarded the British Empire Medal, became a Chevalier of the Brazilian Order of the Southern Cross and was made a Knight of the Norwegian Order of Merit.

Donation To T. T. Durai
Letts helped to save disgraced former Chief Executive Officer of the National Kidney Foundation Singapore, T. T. Durai, from bankruptcy, with a gift of $1 million.

References

1918 births
Recipients of the British Empire Medal
2013 deaths
World War II spies for the United Kingdom
British spies
World War II prisoners of war held by Japan
British World War II prisoners of war
20th-century British businesspeople
British expatriates in Singapore